A purée (or mash) is cooked food, usually vegetables, fruits or legumes, that has been ground, pressed, blended or sieved to the consistency of a creamy paste or liquid. Purées of specific foods are often known by specific names, e.g., applesauce or hummus. The term is of French origin, where it meant in Old French (13th century) purified or refined.

Purées overlap with other dishes with similar consistency, such as thick soups, creams (crèmes) and gravies—although these terms often imply more complex recipes and cooking processes. Coulis (French for "strained") is a similar but broader term, more commonly used for fruit purées. The term is not commonly used for paste-like foods prepared from cereal flours, such as gruel or muesli; nor with oily nut pastes, such as peanut butter. The term "paste" is often used for purées intended to be used as an ingredient, rather than eaten.

Purées can be made in a blender, or with special implements such as a potato masher, or by forcing the food through a strainer, or simply by crushing the food in a pot. Purées generally must be cooked, either before or after grinding, in order to improve flavour and texture, remove toxic substances, and/or reduce their water content.

It is common to purée entire meals (without use of salt or other additives) to be served to toddlers, babies, and those unable to chew as sufficient, nutritious meals. Baby food is often a mash.

Etymology 
The word purée in English is a loanword borrowed from the French purée, descendant from the Old French puree, meaning "made pure." The word can further be traced to the Latin pūrō.

Common purées
Common purées include apples, plums, and other fruits smashed or mashed for their juice content.

 Baba ghanoush (eggplant)
 Bisque (shellfish)
 Ful medames (fava beans)
 Hummus (chickpea)
 Legume soups such as pea soup, bean soup, lentil soup
 Mkhali (colloquially pkhali), Georgian vegetable dips thickened with walnut paste
 Purée Mongole (a mixed pea and tomato soup)
 Pimento (olives)

These fruits and vegetables are often served as purées:

 Apple
 Arracacha
 Banana
 Carrot
 Cassava
 Cauliflower
 Pea
 Peach
 Potato
 Pumpkin
 Rutabaga
 Squash, buttersquash, etc.
 Sweet corn
 Taro purée, called 芋泥 in Teochew cuisine
 Tomato 
 Pickled cucumber
 Mango
 Pineapple
 Avocado

See also
 Gruel
 Guacamole
 Mashing
 Muesli
 Peanut butter
 Pesto
 Polenta
 Potato masher
 Red bean paste
 Saag

References

Cooking techniques
Culinary terminology